Ricardo José da Costa Andorinho (born 14 November 1976 in Évora) is a former Portuguese handball player.

Biography
One of the best Portuguese players of his generation, Andorinho played for Sporting CP, from 1994 to 2004. He then moved to SDC San Antonio, in Spain, where he played the rest of his career. 
In 2004, Andorinho suffered a budgetary restructuring which led him to move to San Antonio of Spain where he played until 2008. Due to a serious injury, he finished his career at the age of 31.

Andorinho made 155 caps for Portugal, scoring a record of 528 goals.

European Competitions
Champions League: Portland San António 
2004/05 - Eighth-finals 8 games - 32 goals 
2005/06 - Finalist defeated 6 Matches - 20 Goals 
2006/07 - Eighth-finals 9 Matches - 28 Goals

National Selection
He played at the World Men's Handball Championship, in 1997, 2001 and 2003.

References

External links
Ricardo Andorinho Farewell to Handball (News In Portuguese)

1976 births
Living people
Portuguese male handball players
People from Évora
Sportspeople from Évora District